Copo National Park is a federal protected area in Santiago del Estero Province, Argentina. Established on 22 November 2000, it houses a representative sample of the Dry Chaco biodiversity in average state of conservation.

Biodiversity
A large part of the park is made up of forests, with the Santiago red quebracho (quebracho colorado santiagueño) being its characteristic tree species. This tree has a strong wood and high content of tannin, and in the past it suffered a devastating exploitation in other parts of the country. At the beginning of the 20th century, Santiago del Estero was 80% quebracho scrubland; nowadays only 20% remain.

Some of the endangered species that live in this park include the maned wolf, jaguar, the giant anteater, the chacoan peccary and the giant armadillo.

References

Bibliography

External links
Administración de Parques Nacionales - Argentina's National Park Administration (in Spanish)

National parks of Argentina
Protected areas of Santiago del Estero Province
Protected areas established in 1998